Jeff Dozier is an American snow hydrologist, environmental scientist, researcher and academic. He is Distinguished Professor Emeritus and Founding Dean of the Bren School of Environmental Science & Management at the University of California, Santa Barbara.

Dozier's research and teaching have focused on snow science, Earth system science, radiative transfer in snow, remote sensing and information systems, image processing, and terrain analysis.

Dozier is a Fellow of the American Geophysical Union and the American Association for the Advancement of Science, a Distinguished Scientist in the Chinese Academy of Sciences, and a recipient of the NASA/Department of Interior William T. Pecora Award and of the NASA Public Service Medal. In 2009, he was awarded the Jim Gray Award from Microsoft. He helped explain optical properties of snow to animators of the film Frozen, which won an Academy Award for Best Animated Feature. He has led six expeditions to the Hindu Kush range in Afghanistan, where he made a dozen first ascents, and has had a climbing destination, Dozier Dome, in Yosemite National Park named after him.

Early life and education 
While Dozier was at the University of California, Berkeley in the early 1960s, he dropped out after a year and a half and went to Europe where he climbed and studied German. He then hitchhiked from Germany to India. His experience during this trip inclined him to learn more about Earth's water and climate. He received his B.A. in Geography from California State University, Hayward (now East Bay) in 1968.

Subsequently, he completed the M.Sc. in 1969 and Ph.D. in 1973 in Geography from the University of Michigan. His Ph.D. thesis was entitled 'An evaluation of the variance minimization principle in river channel adjustment,' and a chapter on adjustment of supraglacial streams was published. In 1971, he joined California State University, Hayward as a lecturer and taught there until he moved to the University of California, Santa Barbara in 1974.

In 1974, Dozier went to the Hindu Kush for his sixth climbing expedition. While crossing a steep slope, Dozier realized that he had no idea whether that slope might avalanche. That experience moved his research interest towards Snow and Avalanches.

Career 
In 1974, Dozier joined University of California, Santa Barbara as an Assistant Professor, becoming Associate Professor in 1980 and Full Professor in 1985. From 1987 to 1990, he worked as a senior member of the technical staff and the Project Scientist for a potential spectroscopy space mission at NASA's Jet Propulsion Laboratory. From 1990 to 1992 he worked at the NASA Goddard Space Flight Center as the Senior Project Scientist at the start of NASA's Earth Observing System, when its configuration was established. In 1992, with Gordon MacDonald and D. James Baker, he co-founded the MEDEA group, which investigated the use of classified data for environmental research, monitoring, and assessment.

In 1994, Dozier founded the Bren School at UCSB and took on the position of its Dean until 2000. He was the chief scientist for the proposed NSF Waters Network from 2008 to 2010 and the principal investigator from 2018 to 2021 of the University of California multicampus Headwaters to Groundwater study, which also included scientists from the Lawrence Livermore and Lawrence Berkeley National Laboratories.

In 2016, Dozier was appointed as the Burges Distinguished Visiting Professor at the University of Washington, and in 2018 he served as a Visiting Distinguished Scientist for the Chinese Academy of Sciences. He was an Editor of Geophysical Research Letters from 1991 to 1993.

Research and work 
Dozier's research extends from detailed studies of snow hydrology to conception and implementation of remote sensing and information management systems that have facilitated developments in the broader Earth science community. He has led interdisciplinary studies in three areas: snow hydrology and biogeochemistry in the mountain environment and its extension to groundwater management in the surrounding lowlands; hydrologic science, environmental engineering, and social science in the water environment; and the integration of environmental science and remote sensing with computer science and technology.

His work in the world's mountains addresses the storage and melting of snow that dominate the hydrologic cycle and have economic and social significance to the people who depend on snowmelt for their water resources. Since mountain environments are rugged, remote, and sometimes uncomfortable, they are difficult to investigate, especially in seasons when snow is widespread. Dozier had insights about the study of mountain snow that continue to yield important benefits for Earth science and its social significance. Shortly after arriving at UC Santa Barbara in 1974, he appreciated that remote sensing from satellites would be the key to measuring snow properties and the energy balance that determines the rates of melting and sublimation, particularly over extensive, inaccessible terrains. His approaches took the view that the information from these satellites would best be interpreted through a rigorous examination of the physics of the sensors, and how the radiation they record interacts with the atmosphere, the ice crystals and liquid water in the snow pack, and the surrounding terrain. Then in the late 1980s and early 1990s, his experience with the EOS Data and Information System and opportunities to work with computer scientists on the National Academy's report on Computing the Future and the Sequoia 2000 project helped him learn how vast amounts of information, which would have to be transmitted and stored to conduct satellite-assisted environmental science, would require thoughtful design and management of very large information systems. Thus, Dozier's research has extended from ground-level studies of energy balance processes to laboratory and field techniques for measuring snow properties, to remote sensing, spatial modeling, and what has become known as environmental informatics.

Dozier's work in remote sensing extended beyond snow. In 1980, he spent a year working for NOAA's National Environmental Satellite, Data, and Information Service in Maryland. There, he and Michael Matson observed tiny bright spots on a satellite image of the Persian Gulf. The image had been captured by the Advanced Very High Resolution Radiometer (AVHRR) instrument on the NOAA-6 satellite, and the spots, they discovered, were campfire-sized flares caused by the burning of methane escaping from oil wells. It marked the first time that such a small fire had been seen from space. He and Matson were intrigued by the possibilities, and Dozier developed a mathematical method to identify small fires in pixels a kilometer in size. This method, published in 1981, became the foundation for nearly all subsequent satellite fire-detection algorithms. Dozier continued work in this area for several years studying thermal infrared remote sensing and how to calculate land surface temperature from space.

Dozier's study of snow and ice properties continued into the 21st century. The work, virtually all undertaken with graduate students, included snow structure  and elution of impurities, the spectral signature of snow from instruments on the Landsat and Terra satellites, estimation of fractional snow cover in pixels that also contain soil and vegetation, retrieval of grain size and liquid water from imaging spectroscopy, and estimation of snow water equivalent from synthetic aperture radar and from reconstruction of the snowpack post-melting from calculations of the energy balance.

Awards and honors 
1968 - NCGE Medal, Outstanding Geography Major, California State University, East Bay 
1988 - Honorary Professor, Institute of Remote Sensing Applications, Chinese Academy of Sciences
1989 - Transactions Prize Paper Award, IEEE Geoscience and Remote Sensing Society
1991 - Fellow, American Geophysical Union
1993 - NASA Public Service Medal
1997 - Moe I. Schneebaum Lecturer, NASA Goddard Space Flight Center
1999 - Fellow, American Association for the Advancement of Science
2005 - William T. Pecora Award, Department of Interior and NASA
2009 - Jim Gray eScience Award, Microsoft Research
2010 - John Nye Lecturer, American Geophysical Union
2014 - For Disney Animation Studios, Academy Award for Best Animated Feature, Frozen
2015 - Best Paper, Western Snow Conference
2016 - Burges Distinguished Visiting Professor, University of Washington
2018 - 13th Jeremy Grantham Lecturer, Indian Institute of Science
2018 - Distinguished Scientist, Chinese Academy of Sciences

Selected articles 
Dozier, J. (1981). A method for satellite identification of surface temperature fields of subpixel resolution. Remote Sensing of Environment, 11, 221-229.
Dozier, J., & Warren, S. G. (1982). Effect of viewing angle on the infrared brightness temperature of snow. Water Resources Research, 18, 1424-1434. 
Dozier, J. (1989). Spectral signature of alpine snow cover from the Landsat Thematic Mapper. Remote Sensing of Environment, 28, 9-22.
Dozier, J., & Frew, J. (1990). Rapid calculation of terrain parameters for radiation modeling from digital elevation data. IEEE Transactions on Geoscience and Remote Sensing, 28, 963-969. 
Wan, Z., & Dozier, J. (1996). A generalized split-window algorithm for retrieving land-surface temperature from space. IEEE Transactions on Geoscience and Remote Sensing, 34, 892-905.
Elder, K., Dozier, J., & Michaelsen, J. (1991). Snow accumulation and distribution in an alpine watershed. Water Resources Research, 27, 1541-1552. 
Marks, D., & Dozier, J. (1992). Climate and energy exchange at the snow surface in the alpine region of the Sierra Nevada, 2, Snow cover energy balance. Water Resources Research, 28, 3043-3054. 
Bales, R. C., Molotch, N. P., Painter, T. H., Dettinger, M. D., Rice, R., & Dozier, J. (2006). Mountain hydrology of the western United States. Water Resources Research, 42, W08432. 
Dozier, J., Green, R. O., Nolin, A. W., & Painter, T. H. (2009). Interpretation of snow properties from imaging spectrometry. Remote Sensing of Environment, 113, S25-S37. 
Dozier, J., Bair, E. H., & Davis, R. E. (2016). Estimating the spatial distribution of snow water equivalent in the world's mountains. WIREs Water, 3, 461-474.

References 

Living people
Environmental scientists
Fellows of the American Association for the Advancement of Science
California State University, East Bay alumni
University of Michigan alumni
University of California, Santa Barbara faculty
1944 births